Jalasjärvi is a former municipality of Finland. It was merged to the town of Kurikka on 1 January 2016.

It is located in the province of Western Finland and is part of the Southern Ostrobothnia region.

The municipality was unilingually Finnish.

Villages
Alavalli, Hirvijärvi, Ilvesjoki, Jalasjärvi, Jokipii, Keskikylä, Koskue, Luopajärvi, Sikakylä, Taivalmaa and Ylivalli.

Sights
 The Devil's Nest, the deepest ground erosion in Europe
 The Local Heritage Museum of Jalasjärvi, one of the largest local museums in Finland, consisting of over 25 rural buildings and a collection of exhibits approaching nearly 30,000 items in total

References

External links
 
 Municipality of Jalasjärvi  – Official website

Jalasjärvi
Populated places established in 1867
Former municipalities of Finland